The Carolina Golf Classic is a tournament on the Epson Tour, the LPGA's developmental tour. It has been a part of the tour's schedule since 2020. It is held at Forest Oaks Country Club in Greensboro, North Carolina.

In 2020, with her win at the Carolina Golf Classic, Ana Belac won Player of the Year and finished first on the Symetra Tour money list earning her LPGA Tour card for the 2021 season.

Winners

References

External links

Coverage on Epson Tour website

Symetra Tour events
Golf in North Carolina
Recurring sporting events established in 2020
2020 establishments in North Carolina